The Falsino River is a river of Amapá state in north-eastern Brazil. It is a tributary of the Araguari River.

The river defines the eastern boundary of the  Amapá National Forest, a sustainable use conservation unit created in 1989.

See also
List of rivers of Amapá

References

Rivers of Amapá